Rahul Raj  is an Indian music composer. He has composed and produced scores and soundtracks predominantly for Malayalam movies. He is an alumnus of the prestigious Berklee College of Music and holds a postgraduate degree in scoring for films, TV and video games.

Early life
Rahul Raj was born in Kochi to Advocate E. Thankappan and N. S. Kunjoonjamma. His schooling was in Bhavans Vidya Mandir, Elamakkara Cochin. He has one sister, Rehna Raj. From the age of 6, he was trained in Mridangam and Carnatic Music. He graduated as an IT Engineer from CUSAT, Cochin and later on pursued courses such as CCNP and CCIE in Bangalore ILloka networks, before moving to London.

During his stint in London, he underwent training in Electronic Sound Production. He helped Pradeep Menon, a UK-based Indian businessman, remix a Tamil Ayappa record that was originally produced, composed and sung by Pradeep Menon and Shashi Kumar in 1985. The devotional album produced in the UK, Canada and India is titled Sabari Beats. It was released in November 2002 by Super recording in Tamil Nadu. Noted musicians like Pravin Mani, Saroja, and Kamalakar were featured. This launched Rahul Raj's career. He also arranged another song for Pradeep Menon called "Krishna Krishna" with percussionist Sivamani and James Asher from United Kingdom.

Career

On returning to India, Rahul composed more than 100 jingles for commercials in Malayalam, Tamil, Hindi and Telugu. During this period, he had also composed original themes for many television productions, including shows for Asianet and Amrita TV.

In 2003, he composed the anthem Lokaha Samastha for Amma's 50th birth anniversary, Amrithavarsam 50, which was later used as the theme song for Amrita TV. He composed Malayalam albums during the period, which include En Jeevane (Pularmanju pole), which was shot completely in the United States by producer–director Tom George Kolath. The song "Pularmanjupol Nee" from the album, rendered by Karthik and Sujatha, became an evergreen hit.

He was given the opportunity to compose the logo theme music for the show 50 Years of Malayalam Film Music with Padma Bhusan Dr. K. J. Yesudas.

His first feature film score and soundtrack were for Chotta Mumbai, directed by Anwar Rasheed and starring Mohanlal in the lead. His second release was Suresh Gopi's Time directed by Shaji Kailas.
Shankar Mahadevan sang in one of his compositions for Chotta Mumbai.

In 2008, he replaced the trio Shankar–Ehsaan–Loy as the composer of the Malayalam feature film Maya Bazar, in which he worked with the Tamil film production company Ayngaran International. In the same year, he became the first music composer in Malayalam movie industry to have a registered fans' association, called RRFA (Rahul Raj Fans Association), based in Thiruvananthapuram.

In 2009, he composed for filmmaker Shyamaprasad's Ritu, for which he subsequently won the Vayalar Award. The award was given by a jury of old school musicians including K.P. Udayabhanu.

In 2010, he won the Kerala State Award for Best Background Score for Ritu. The same year, he was invited to University at Buffalo, The State University of New York to rework and expand Pomp and Circumstance Marches, the traditional convocation music used by them, composed by Sir Edward Elgar. In addition to expanding Edward Elgar's piece, he composed two original music pieces for the convocation, Dance of the Gods and The Circumstance by Rahul Raj. In the same year he signed a project called Mathilukalkkapuram, a sequel to Adoor Gopalakrishnan's classic Mathilukal. The Mammootty starrer which also had Ravi K. Chandran and Resul Pookutty on board as cinematographer and sound designer respectively was subsequently shelved.

His only release in 2010 was Chekavar which tanked at the box-office, with the music too not appealing to the masses. Later in the year he was approached to score The Thriller which he declined. He was also approached to score two other films which were 2011 releases, Doubles and China Town both of which he rejected citing time constraints.

In 2011, Rahul Raj made his debut in Telugu cinema by composing music for the Siddharth – Shruti Haasan starrer Oh My Friend. The audio of the film opened to overwhelming responses and rave reviews, climbing to the No. 1 position in Telugu music charts, with the song "Maa Daddy Pockets" in particular becoming a rage among the youth. The audio went on to mark record sales of 3 lakh CDs within nine days of release.

After almost a two-year hiatus, in 2012 he returned to the Malayalam industry by scoring for Amal Neerad's Bachelor Party. The songs became sensational hits and the background score received critical acclaim.

In 2013, he composed for Kili Poyi, which was supposedly the first stoner film in Malayalam Cinema. Though the film opened to mixed responses, the title song became a huge hit. Several critics hailed the background score as the most interesting technical aspect of the movie.

Rahul had a dull opening in 2014 with the high budget romantic comedy London Bridge and Mannar Mathai Speaking 2 the much hyped sequel to the cult comedy classic Mannar Mathai Speaking failing at the box office. Rahul had composed only three tracks for London Bridge, as he had to leave the project owing to scheduling conflicts. Later in the year, the Telugu film Paathshala for which he had composed, became a box office success. Rahul's songs for the movie were received well, but it was his background score that was unanimously praised by all reviewers, as a major plus point, crediting it to have elevated the movie to a different level.

The year 2015, opened on a favourable note for Rahul, as his background score for the Mammootty starrer Fireman received praise. His second release of the year was Sidhartha Siva's Ain which won the National Film Award for Best Feature Film in Malayalam. The month of August saw the release of his songs from Kohinoor, a heist film set in the 1980s. The song Hemanthamen went on to rake in unanimous praise from critics and public alike, being hailed as an outstanding nostalgic melody.

With releases like Kasaba, IDI-Inspector Dawood Ibrahim making no significant impact, 2016 was a comparatively listless year for Rahul Raj.

The year 2017 opened on an excellent note with his song Lailakame from Ezra becoming a smash hit, prompting several cover versions, including one by Rahul Raj himself.

In early 2018, the film Kuttanadan Marpappa met with negative reviews with the music too receiving a lukewarm response. He signed Academy Award Winner Resul Pookutty's multilingual titled The Sound Story directed by Pookutty's protege Prasad Prabhakar. The movie was touted to feature 164 tracks comprising background score pieces  and 2 songs. He composed the songs of the film, but opted out before  composing the background score, as there were schedule conflicts with his stint in Berklee, Spain. For the same reason, he also had to opt out of Kodathi Samaksham Balan Vakeel after giving two songs.

In June 2019, he composed and conducted the symphonic piece Birth of the Nemesis, which was performed by the London Orchestra. He returned from Europe in July 2019 and was immediately signed by Priyadarshan to compose the background score of his magnum opus Marakkar: Arabikadalinte Simham, a historical epic set in the 16th century. Having no release in 2020 due to pandemic-induced postponements, his first release after the 2020 lockdown was the Mammootty-starrer The Priest in early 2021. The film opened to mixed reviews, but the music met with overwhelmingly positive responses, particularly the  score with IBTimes hailing it as the major  highlight of the film. His first release in 2022 was the Mohanlal-starrer Aarattu, directed by B. Unnikrishnan  which received predominantly positive reviews for the music, despite the film being critically panned. Meanwhile, veteran director Sathyan Anthikad signed him to score his Jayaram-starrer Makal. His other notable upcoming releases are the Nivin Pauly-starrer Thaaram directed by Vinay Govind, Narayaneente Moonaanmakkal directed by Sharan Venugopal, The Statesman directed by Kishore Prakash Menon and an untitled film directed by Rathish Ambat in Malayalam; Yaar in Tamil; and another untitled film in Hindi.

Orchestration
Rahul Raj is known for giving ultra-modern orchestration in his songs. He uses international elements for the instrumentation in his songs. His background scores in particular are rich with elements of symphony and Western Classical music.

Personal life
Rahul is married to Miriam, a German national and has a daughter Akshaine, who was born in 2012.

Film discography

2000s

2010s

2020s

Independent studio albums
The following section contains the independent studio album(s) composed, arranged and produced by Rahul Raj.

Short films

Awards and nominations

As President of FEFKA Music Directors' Union
In 2013, Rahul Raj was designated as the President of the FEFKA Music Directors' Union, the official association of film composers in the Malayalam film industry.

References

External links
 

Living people
Malayalam film score composers
Musicians from Kochi
Malayali people
Film musicians from Kerala
1980 births
21st-century Indian composers
Tamil film score composers
Telugu film score composers